The Edmonton Eskimos upset the Montreal Alouettes to send the Grey Cup trophy back west for the first time since 1948.

Canadian Football News in 1954
1954 is generally recognized as the start of the modern era of Canadian football.

The BC Lions joined the WIFU and adopted the colours of burnt orange and brown. The NBC national network were televising IRFU games.

Winnipeg's Gerry James (RB), became the first player to win the Most Outstanding Canadian Award.

This was the last season that the Ontario Rugby Football Union would be allowed to challenge for the Grey Cup.

Regular season

Final regular season standings
Source:

Note: GP = Games Played, W = Wins, L = Losses, T = Ties, PF = Points For, PA = Points Against, Pts = Points

Bold text means that they have clinched the playoffs.
Edmonton has a bye and will play in the WIFU Finals.

Grey Cup playoffs
Source:

Note: All dates in 1954

Semifinals

Winnipeg won the total-point series by 27–25. The Blue Bombers will play the Edmonton Eskimos in the WIFU Finals.

Finals

 Kitchener-Waterloo wins the best of three series 2–0. The Dutchmen will advance to the Grey Cup semifinal. 

Edmonton wins the best of three series 2–1. The Eskimos will advance to the Grey Cup semifinal.

 Montreal wins the best of three series 2–0. The Alouettes will advance to the Grey Cup game.

Grey Cup semifinal

The Edmonton Eskimos will advance to the Grey Cup game.

Playoff bracket

Final appearance in the Grey Cup playoffs by the ORFU

Grey Cup Championship

Canadian Football Leaders
 CFL Passing Leaders
 CFL Rushing Leaders
 CFL Receiving Leaders

1954 Eastern (Interprovincial Rugby Football Union) All-Stars
Offence
QB – Sam Etcheverry, Montreal Alouettes
RB – Alex Webster, Montreal Alouettes
RB – Gene Wilson, Toronto Argonauts
RB – Bernie Custis, Hamilton Tiger-Cats
E  – Red O'Quinn, Montreal Alouettes
E  – Ray Ramsey, Hamilton Tiger-Cats
FW – Joey Pal, Montreal Alouettes
C  – Tommy Hugo, Montreal Alouettes
OG – Ray Cicia, Montreal Alouettes
OG – Herb Trawick, Montreal Alouettes
OT – Tex Coulter, Montreal Alouettes
OT – Vince Mazza, Hamilton Tiger-CatsDefence
DT – Tex Coulter, Montreal Alouettes
DT – Jim Staton, Montreal Alouettes
DE – Pete Neumann, Hamilton Tiger-Cats
DE – Doug McNichol, Montreal Alouettes
DG – Vince Scott, Hamilton Tiger-Cats
DG – Eddie Bevan, Hamilton Tiger-Cats
LB – Red Ettinger, Toronto Argonauts
LB – Tommy Hugo, Montreal Alouettes
DB – Lou Kusserow, Hamilton Tiger-Cats
DB – Hal Patterson, Montreal Alouettes
S  – Bill MacFarlane, Toronto Argonauts
S  - Billy Cross, Toronto Argonauts

1954 Western (Western Interprovincial Football Union) All-Stars
Offence
QB – Frank Tripucka, Saskatchewan Roughriders
RB – Rollie Miles, Edmonton Eskimos
RB – Jackie Parker, Edmonton Eskimos
RB – Howard Waugh, Calgary Stampeders
RB – Ed Macon, Calgary Stampeders
E  – Mac Speedie, Saskatchewan Roughriders
E  – Bud Grant, Winnipeg Blue Bombers
C  – Eagle Keys, Edmonton Eskimos
OG – Mario DeMarco, Saskatchewan Roughriders
OG – Roy Jenson, Calgary Stampeders
OT – Dick Huffman, Winnipeg Blue Bombers
OT – Martin Ruby, Saskatchewan RoughridersDefence
DT – Dick Huffman, Winnipeg Blue Bombers
DT – Martin Ruby, Saskatchewan Roughriders
DE – Frank Anderson, Edmonton Eskimos
DE – Gene Brito, Calgary Stampeders
DG – Mike Cassidy, Saskatchewan Roughriders
DG – Bob Levenhagen, BC Lions
LB – John Wozniak, Saskatchewan Roughriders
LB – Ed Henke, Calgary Stampeders
DB – Stan Williams, Saskatchewan Roughriders
DB – Bobby Marlow, Saskatchewan Roughriders
DB – Rollie Miles, Edmonton Eskimos
S  – Tom Casey, Winnipeg Blue Bombers

1954 Ontario Rugby Football Union All-Stars
NOTE: During this time most players played both ways, so the All-Star selections do not distinguish between some offensive and defensive positions.
QB – Bob Celeri, Kitchener-Waterloo Dutchmen
RB – Cookie Gilchrist, Sarnia Imperials
RB – Paul Amodio, Kitchener-Waterloo Dutchmen
RB – Nayland Moll, Toronto Balmy Beach Beachers
RB – Blake Taylor, Kitchener-Waterloo Dutchmen
E  – Harvey Singleton, Toronto Balmy Beach Beachers
E  – Gerry McTaggart, Kitchener-Waterloo Dutchmen
FW – Carl Totzke, Kitchener-Waterloo Dutchmen
C  – Bruce Mattingly, Sarnia Imperials
G – Jay Fry, Kitchener-Waterloo Dutchmen
G – Lloyd "Dutch" Davey, Sarnia Imperials
T – Keith Carpenter, Toronto Balmy Beach Beachers
T – Dan Nykoluk, Toronto Balmy Beach Beachers

1954 Canadian Football Awards
 Most Outstanding Player Award – Sam Etcheverry (QB), Montreal Alouettes
 Most Outstanding Canadian Award – Gerry James (RB), Winnipeg Blue Bombers
 Jeff Russel Memorial Trophy (IRFU MVP) – Sam Etcheverry (QB), Montreal Alouettes
 Jeff Nicklin Memorial Trophy (WIFU MVP) - Jackie Parker (RB), Edmonton Eskimos
 Gruen Trophy (IRFU Rookie of the Year) - Ron Howell (WR), Hamilton Tiger-Cats
 Dr. Beattie Martin Trophy (WIFU Rookie of the Year) - Lynn Bottoms (HB), Calgary Stampeders
 Imperial Oil Trophy (ORFU MVP) - Bob Celeri - Kitchener-Waterloo Dutchmen

References

 
Canadian Football League seasons